Paul Franken (27 June 1894 – Autumn 1944) was a German Socialist politician.

Following Nazi seizure of power in January 1933, his party was banned and he fled. He lived in various countries before settling in the Soviet Union, where in 1936 he was briefly arrested. He was arrested again in 1937 in one of Stalin's political purges.   He was detained for the next seven years and is believed to have died in a labour camp in the northern part of European Russia during the Autumn of 1944.

Life
Paul Franken was born in Höhscheid (Solingen), some 40 km (25 miles) east of Düsseldorf in the heavily industrialised Ruhr region of Germany. His father was a foundry worker. Franken attended school locally and in 1908 started training as a specialist metal worker (Former & Nadler).   In 1911 he joined the Social Democratic Party (SPD / Sozialdemokratische Partei Deutschlands) and in 1914 he was conscripted for military service.   In 1917 he joined the newly formed Independent Social Democratic Party (USPD / Unabhängige Sozialdemokratische Partei Deutschlands) which had broken away from the mainstream SPD, primarily over the issue of whether or not to continue supporting funding for the war which had broken out in July/August 1914.

During the revolutionary period that followed the end of the war Franken was a member of Workers' and Soldiers' Councils in the Solingen district. On the political left there was further factionalism and fragmentation during the years that followed, and by 1920 Franken was an activist member of the Communist Party.   It was probably around this time, in 1920, that he married the fellow left-wing activist, Flora Goldberg (1899–1991).   In June 1920 he stood, unsuccessfully, for election to the Reichstag as a Communist Party candidate.   In January 1921 he joined the Communist Work Community (party - KAG / Kommunistische Arbeitsgemeinschaft) but this movement proved short-lived, and by May 1922 he was back in the USPD.   In the meantime, he was elected a member of the Prussian Landtag (regional legislative assembly) where he sat till 1924, and again between 1928 and 1933. In the meantime, in 1922 he switched his party affiliation back to the SPD.   In addition, between 1922 he was working as a writer and newspaper editor in Solingen.

In 1924 the couple relocated to Zeitz, some 450 km (280 miles) to the east, where Flora Franken, who joined the SPD in 1925 sat on the district council till 1933.   Paul Franken became a member of the SPD local leadership team in Zeitz where from November 1924 he was also editing the SPD daily newspaper, (Zeitzer) "Volksbote".   He was active in the cultural and educational fields, working in the SPD's Reichsarbeitsgemeinschaft der Kinderfreunde / RAG (loosely National Children's Friendly Society).   In 1928, after a break of four years, he returned to the Landtag (Prussian regional legislative assembly).

The Nazi Party took power in January 1933 and lost little time in transforming the country into a one-party state. During 1933 Paul Franken's membership of the Landtag (Prussian regional legislative assembly), like the assembly itself, came to an end after a few months.   Flora Franken, who was both Jewish and a Socialist, had even more reason to fear the Nazis than her husband, and emigrated to Riga, joining her mother in Latvia.   Paul Franken either accompanied her or emigrated via Czechoslovakia. Either way, they were both in Latvia when Kārlis Ulmanis in May 1934 took power, obliging them to escape from a new single party right-wing dictatorship for the second time in less than two years. They moved to Sweden, and applied for permission to emigrate to the Soviet Union. The Soviet authorities granted their application in August 1934 and they moved to Leningrad (as St. Petersburg was known at that time).

In Leningrad Paul Franken worked at the vast Putilov Factory.   In May 1936 he was accepted back into the German Communist Party, now overwhelmingly exiled, its members based mostly in Paris or Moscow. In November 1937 he was arrested by the NKVD and detained, in the context of a great surge in political purges taking place that year. He was taken to one of the network of Labour Camps located inside the Arctic Circle. Here, under appalling conditions, he died in the autumn of 1944 in the labour camp at Adak near Vorkuta.

Flora Franken, who had accompanied her husband to the Soviet Union in 1934, was permitted to return to the German Democratic Republic with her son, Peter, in May 1955. She took a job with Dietz Verlag (the Berlin publishing house), later switching to the (closely associated) Marxism-Leninism Institute of East Germany's ruling Socialist Unity Party (Central Committee).

References

Prussian politicians
People of the German Revolution of 1918–1919
Independent Social Democratic Party politicians
Communist Party of Germany politicians
Social Democratic Party of Germany politicians
People condemned by Nazi courts
Victims of human rights abuses
People who died in the Gulag
1894 births
1944 deaths
20th-century German journalists
German military personnel of World War I